The crested hornero (Furnarius cristatus) is a species of bird in the family Furnariidae. It is found in Argentina, Bolivia, and Paraguay. Its natural habitat is subtropical or tropical dry shrubland.

References

Furnarius
Birds described in 1888
Birds of Argentina
Birds of Bolivia
Birds of Paraguay
Taxonomy articles created by Polbot